Death is the irreversible cessation of all biological functions that sustain an organism. For organisms with a brain, death can also be defined as the irreversible cessation of functioning of the whole brain, including the brainstem, and brain death is sometimes used as a legal definition of death. The remains of a former organism normally begin to decompose shortly after death. Death is an inevitable process that eventually occurs in all organisms. Some organisms, such as Turritopsis dohrnii, are biologically immortal. However, they can still die from other means than aging.

Figuring out when someone is dead has been a problem. Initially, there was the definition of death when breathing and the heartbeat ceased. However, the spread of CPR no longer meant it was irreversible. Brain death was the next option, which fractured between different definitions. Some people believe that all brain functions must cease. Some believe that even if the brainstem is still alive, their personality and identity are dead, so therefore, they should be entirely dead.

Death is generally applied to whole organisms; the similar process seen in individual components of an organism, such as cells or tissues, is necrosis. Something that is not considered an organism, such as a virus, can be physically destroyed but is not said to die, as a virus is not considered alive. As of the early 21st century, 56 million people die per year. The most common reason is cardiovascular disease, which is a disease that affects the heart.

Many cultures and religions have the idea of an afterlife and also may hold the idea of judgment of good and bad deeds in one's life. There may also be different customs for honoring the body, such as a funeral, cremation, or sky burial.

Death is actively trying to be cured by a group of scientists known as biogerontologists, through seeking to do the same as biologically immortal organisms do and applying a similar means to humans. However, as humans do not have the means to apply this to themselves, they have to use other ways to reach the maximum lifespan for a human, such as calorie reduction, dieting, and exercise.

Diagnosis

Problems of definition
The concept of death is a key to human understanding of the phenomenon. There are many scientific approaches and various interpretations of the concept. Additionally, the advent of life-sustaining therapy and the numerous criteria for defining death from both a medical and legal standpoint have made it difficult to create a single unifying definition.

Defining life to define death 
One of the challenges in defining death is in distinguishing it from life. As a point in time, death seems to refer to the moment when life ends. Determining when death has occurred is difficult, as cessation of life functions is often not simultaneous across organ systems. Such determination, therefore, requires drawing precise conceptual boundaries between life and death. This is difficult due to there being little consensus on how to define life.

It is possible to define life in terms of consciousness. When consciousness ceases, an organism can be said to have died. One of the flaws in this approach is that there are many organisms that are alive but probably not conscious. Another problem is in defining consciousness, which has many different definitions given by modern scientists, psychologists and philosophers. Additionally, many religious traditions, including Abrahamic and Dharmic traditions, hold that death does not (or may not) entail the end of consciousness. In certain cultures, death is more of a process than a single event. It implies a slow shift from one spiritual state to another.

Other definitions for death focus on the character of cessation of organismic functioning and human death, which refers to irreversible loss of personhood. More specifically, death occurs when a living entity experiences irreversible cessation of all functioning. As it pertains to human life, death is an irreversible process where someone loses their existence as a person.

Definition of death by heartbeat and breath 
Historically, attempts to define the exact moment of a human's death have been subjective or imprecise. Death was defined as the cessation of heartbeat (cardiac arrest) and breathing, but the development of CPR and prompt defibrillation have rendered that definition inadequate because breathing and heartbeat can sometimes be restarted. This type of death where circulatory and respiratory arrest happens is known as the circulatory definition of death (CDD). Proponents of the CDD believe this definition is reasonable because a person with permanent loss of circulatory and respiratory function should be considered dead. Critics of this definition state that while cessation of these functions may be permanent, it does not mean the situation is irreversible because if CPR was applied fast enough, the person could be revived. Thus, the arguments for and against the CDD boil down to defining the actual words "permanent" and "irreversible," which further complicates the challenge of defining death. Furthermore, events causally linked to death in the past no longer kill in all circumstances; without a functioning heart or lungs, life can sometimes be sustained with a combination of life support devices, organ transplants, and artificial pacemakers.

Brain death 
Today, where a definition of the moment of death is required, doctors and coroners usually turn to "brain death" or "biological death" to define a person as being dead; people are considered dead when the electrical activity in their brain ceases. It is presumed that an end of electrical activity indicates the end of consciousness. Suspension of consciousness must be permanent and not transient, as occurs during certain sleep stages, and especially a coma. In the case of sleep, EEGs can easily tell the difference.

The category of "brain death" is seen as problematic by some scholars. For instance, Dr. Franklin Miller, a senior faculty member at the Department of Bioethics, National Institutes of Health, notes: "By the late 1990s... the equation of brain death with death of the human being was increasingly challenged by scholars, based on evidence regarding the array of biological functioning displayed by patients correctly diagnosed as having this condition who were maintained on mechanical ventilation for substantial periods of time. These patients maintained the ability to sustain circulation and respiration, control temperature, excrete wastes, heal wounds, fight infections and, most dramatically, to gestate fetuses (in the case of pregnant "brain-dead" women)."

While "brain death" is viewed as problematic by some scholars, there are certainly proponents of it that believe this definition of death is the most reasonable for distinguishing life from death. The reasoning behind the support for this definition is that brain death has a set of criteria that is reliable and reproducible. Also, the brain is crucial in determining our identity or who we are as human beings. The distinction should be made that "brain death" cannot be equated with one in a vegetative state or coma, in that the former situation describes a state that is beyond recovery.

EEGs can detect spurious electrical impulses, while certain drugs, hypoglycemia, hypoxia, or hypothermia can suppress or even stop brain activity temporarily; because of this, hospitals have protocols for determining brain death involving EEGs at widely separated intervals under defined conditions.

Neocortical brain death 
People maintaining that only the neo-cortex of the brain is necessary for consciousness sometimes argue that only electrical activity should be considered when defining death. Eventually, the criterion for death may be the permanent and irreversible loss of cognitive function, as evidenced by the death of the cerebral cortex. All hope of recovering human thought and personality is then gone, given current and foreseeable medical technology. Even by whole-brain criteria, the determination of brain death can be complicated.

Total brain death 

At present, in most places, the more conservative definition of death – irreversible cessation of electrical activity in the whole brain, as opposed to just in the neo-cortex – has been adopted. For example, the Uniform Determination Of Death Act in the United States. In the past, the adoption of this whole-brain definition was a conclusion of the President's Commission for the Study of Ethical Problems in Medicine and Biomedical and Behavioral Research in 1980. They concluded that this approach to defining death sufficed in reaching a uniform definition nationwide. A multitude of reasons was presented to support this definition, including uniformity of standards in law for establishing death, consumption of a family's fiscal resources for artificial life support, and legal establishment for equating brain death with death to proceed with organ donation.

Problems in medical practice 
Aside from the issue of support of or dispute against brain death, there is another inherent problem in this categorical definition: the variability of its application in medical practice. In 1995, the American Academy of Neurology (AAN) established a criteria that became the medical standard for diagnosing neurologic death. At that time, three clinical features had to be satisfied to determine "irreversible cessation" of the total brain, including coma with clear etiology, cessation of breathing, and lack of brainstem reflexes. This criteria was updated again, most recently in 2010, but substantial discrepancies remain across hospitals and medical specialties.

Donations 
The problem of defining death is especially imperative as it pertains to the dead donor rule, which could be understood as one of the following interpretations of the rule: there must be an official declaration of death in a person before starting organ procurement, or that organ procurement cannot result in the death of the donor. A great deal of controversy has surrounded the definition of death and the dead donor rule. Advocates of the rule believe that the rule is legitimate in protecting organ donors while also countering any moral or legal objection to organ procurement. Critics, on the other hand, believe that the rule does not uphold the best interests of the donors and that the rule does not effectively promote organ donation.

Signs

Signs of death or strong indications that a warm-blooded animal is no longer alive are:
 Respiratory arrest (no breathing)
 Cardiac arrest (no pulse)
 Brain death (no neuronal activity)
The stages that follow after death are:
 , paleness which happens in 15–120 minutes after death
 , the reduction in body temperature following death. This is generally a steady decline until matching ambient temperature
 , the limbs of the corpse become stiff (Latin rigor) and difficult to move or manipulate
 , a settling of the blood in the lower (dependent) portion of the body
 Putrefaction, the beginning signs of decomposition
 Decomposition, the reduction into simpler forms of matter, accompanied by a strong, unpleasant odor.
 Skeletonization, the end of decomposition, where all soft tissues have decomposed, leaving only the skeleton.
 Fossilization, the natural preservation of the skeletal remains formed over a very long period

Legal

The death of a person has legal consequences that may vary between jurisdictions. Most countries follow the whole-brain death criteria, where all functions of the brain must have completely ceased. However, in other jurisdictions, some follow the brainstem version of brain death. Afterward, a death certificate is issued in most jurisdictions, either by a doctor or by an administrative office, upon presentation of a doctor's declaration of death.

Misdiagnosis

There are many anecdotal references to people being declared dead by physicians and then "coming back to life," sometimes days later in their coffin or when embalming procedures are about to begin. From the mid-18th century onwards, there was an upsurge in the public's fear of being mistakenly buried alive and much debate about the uncertainty of the signs of death. Various suggestions were made to test for signs of life before burial, ranging from pouring vinegar and pepper into the corpse's mouth to applying red hot pokers to the feet or into the rectum. Writing in 1895, the physician J.C. Ouseley claimed that as many as 2,700 people were buried prematurely each year in England and Wales, although others estimated the figure to be closer to 800.

In cases of electric shock, cardiopulmonary resuscitation (CPR) for an hour or longer can allow stunned nerves to recover, allowing an apparently dead person to survive. People found unconscious under icy water may survive if their faces are kept continuously cold until they arrive at an emergency room. This "diving response," in which metabolic activity and oxygen requirements are minimal, is something humans share with cetaceans called the mammalian diving reflex.

As medical technologies advance, ideas about when death occurs may have to be reevaluated in light of the ability to restore a person to vitality after longer periods of apparent death (as happened when CPR and defibrillation showed that cessation of heartbeat is inadequate as a decisive indicator of death). The lack of electrical brain activity may not be enough to consider someone scientifically dead. Therefore, the concept of information-theoretic death has been suggested as a better means of defining when true death occurs, though the concept has few practical applications outside the field of cryonics.

Causes 

The leading cause of human death in developing countries is infectious disease. The leading causes in developed countries are atherosclerosis (heart disease and stroke), cancer, and other diseases related to obesity and aging. By an extremely wide margin, the largest unifying cause of death in the developed world is biological aging, leading to various complications known as aging-associated diseases. These conditions cause loss of homeostasis, leading to cardiac arrest, causing loss of oxygen and nutrient supply, causing irreversible deterioration of the brain and other tissues. Of the roughly 150,000 people who die each day across the globe, about two thirds die of age-related causes. In industrialized nations, the proportion is much higher, approaching 90%. With improved medical capability, dying has become a condition to be managed.

In developing nations, inferior sanitary conditions and lack of access to modern medical technology make death from infectious diseases more common than in developed countries. One such disease is tuberculosis, a bacterial disease that killed 1.8 million people in 2015. Malaria causes about 400–900 million cases of fever and 1–3M deaths annually. The AIDS death toll in Africa may reach 90–100 million by 2025.

According to Jean Ziegler, the United Nations Special Reporter on the Right to Food, 2000 – Mar 2008, mortality due to malnutrition accounted for 58% of the total mortality rate in 2006. Ziegler says worldwide, approximately 62 million people died from all causes and of those deaths, more than 36 million died of hunger or diseases due to deficiencies in micronutrients.

Tobacco smoking killed 100 million people worldwide in the 20th century and could kill 1 billion people worldwide in the 21st century, a World Health Organization report warned.

Many leading developed world causes of death can be postponed by diet and physical activity, but the accelerating incidence of disease with age still imposes limits on human longevity. The evolutionary cause of aging is, at best, only beginning to be understood. It has been suggested that direct intervention in the aging process may now be the most effective intervention against major causes of death.

Selye proposed a unified non-specific approach to many causes of death. He demonstrated that stress decreases the adaptability of an organism and proposed to describe adaptability as a special resource, adaptation energy. The animal dies when this resource is exhausted. Selye assumed that adaptability is a finite supply presented at birth. Later, Goldstone proposed the concept of production or income of adaptation energy which may be stored (up to a limit) as a capital reserve of adaptation. In recent works, adaptation energy is considered an internal coordinate on the "dominant path" in the model of adaptation. It is demonstrated that oscillations of well-being appear when the reserve of adaptability is almost exhausted.

In 2012, suicide overtook car crashes as the leading cause of human injury deaths in the U.S., followed by poisoning, falls, and murder. The causes of death are different in different parts of the world. In high-income and middle-income countries, nearly half up to more than two-thirds of all people live beyond the age of 70 and predominantly die of chronic diseases. In low-income countries, where less than one in five of all people reach the age of 70, and more than a third of all deaths are among children under 15, people predominantly die of infectious diseases.

In animals, predation can be a common cause of death, livestock have a 6% death rate from predation. However, if you are younger, 50% of young foxes die to birds, bobcats, coyotes, and other foxes as well. Young bear cubs in the Yellowstone National Park only have a 40% chance to survive to adulthood from other bears and predators.

Natural disasters kill around 45,000 people annually, although this number can vary to millions to thousands on a per decade basis. Some of the deadliest natural disasters are the 1931 China Floods, which killed and estimated 4 million people, although, estimates widely vary, the 1887 Yellow River Flood, which killed an estimated 2 million people in China, and the 1970 Bhola Cyclone, killing 500,000 people in Pakistan.

Accidents and disasters have many different types, from nuclear disasters and structural collapses. One of the deadliest incidents of all time is the Failure of the 1975 Banqiao Dam Failure, with varying estimates, up to 240,000 dead. Other incidents with high death tolls are; the Wanggongchang explosion when a gunpowder factory ended up with 20,000 deaths, a collapse of a wall of Circus Maximus killing 13,000 people, and the Chernobyl disaster killing between 95 to 4,000 people killed.

Autopsy 

An autopsy, also known as a postmortem examination or an obduction, is a medical procedure that consists of a thorough examination of a human corpse to determine the cause and manner of a person's death and to evaluate any disease or injury that may be present. It is usually performed by a specialized medical doctor called a pathologist.

Autopsies are either performed for legal or medical purposes. A forensic autopsy is carried out when the cause of death may be a criminal matter, while a clinical or academic autopsy is performed to find the medical cause of death and is used in cases of unknown or uncertain death, or for research purposes. Autopsies can be further classified into cases where external examination suffices, and those where the body is dissected and an internal examination is conducted. Permission from next of kin may be required for internal autopsy in some cases. Once an internal autopsy is complete the body is generally reconstituted by sewing it back together.

A necropsy, which is not always a medical procedure, was a term previously used to describe an unregulated postmortem examination. In modern times, this term is more commonly associated with the corpses of animals.

Death before birth 

Death before birth can happen in several ways: stillbirth, when the fetus dies before or during the delivery process; miscarriage, when the embryo dies before independent survival; and abortion, the artificial termination of the pregnancy. Stillbirth and miscarriage can happen for various reasons, while abortion is carried out purposely.

Stillbirth 
Stillbirth can happen right before or after the delivery of a fetus. It can result from defects of the fetus or risk factors present in the mother. Reductions of these factors, caesarean sections when risks are present, and early detection of birth defects have lowered the rate of stillbirth. However, 1% of births in the United States end in a stillbirth.

Miscarriage 
A miscarriage is defined by the World Health Organization as, "The expulsion or extraction from its mother of an embryo or fetus weighing 500g or less." Miscarriage is one of the most frequent problems in pregnancy, and is reported in around 12–15% of all clinical pregnancies; however, by including pregnancy losses during menstruation, it could be up to 17–22% of all pregnancies. There are many risk-factors involved in miscarriage; consumption of caffeine, tobacco, alcohol, drugs, having a previous miscarriage, and the use of abortion can increase the chances of having a miscarriage.

Abortion 
An abortion may be performed for many reasons, such as pregnancy from rape, financial constraints of having a child, teenage pregnancy, and the lack of support from a significant other. There are two forms of abortion: a medical abortion and an in-clinic abortion or sometimes referred to as a surgical abortion. A medical abortion involves taking a pill that will terminate the pregnancy no more than 11 weeks past the last period, and an in-clinic abortion involves a medical procedure using suction to empty the uterus; this is possible after 12 weeks, but it may be more difficult to find an operating doctor who will go through with the procedure.

Senescence 

Senescence refers to a scenario when a living being can survive all calamities but eventually dies due to causes relating to old age. Conversely, premature death can refer to a death that occurs before old age arrives, for example, human death before a person reaches the age of 75. Animal and plant cells normally reproduce and function during the whole period of natural existence, but the aging process derives from the deterioration of cellular activity and the ruination of regular functioning. The aptitude of cells for gradual deterioration and mortality means that cells are naturally sentenced to stable and long-term loss of living capacities, even despite continuing metabolic reactions and viability. In the United Kingdom, for example, nine out of ten of all the deaths that occur daily relates to senescence, while around the world, it accounts for two-thirds of 150,000 deaths that take place daily.

Almost all animals who survive external hazards to their biological functioning eventually die from biological aging, known in life sciences as "senescence." Some organisms experience negligible senescence, even exhibiting biological immortality. These include the jellyfish Turritopsis dohrnii, the hydra, and the planarian. Unnatural causes of death include suicide and predation. Of all causes, roughly 150,000 people die around the world each day. Of these, two-thirds die directly or indirectly due to senescence, but in industrialized countries – such as the United States, the United Kingdom, and Germany – the rate approaches 90% (i.e., nearly nine out of ten of all deaths are related to senescence).

Physiological death is now seen as a process, more than an event: conditions once considered indicative of death are now reversible. Where in the process, a dividing line is drawn between life and death depends on factors beyond the presence or absence of vital signs. In general, clinical death is neither necessary nor sufficient for a determination of legal death. A patient with working heart and lungs determined to be brain dead can be pronounced legally dead without clinical death occurring.

Life extension 

Life extension refers to an increase in maximum or average lifespan, especially in humans, by slowing down or reversing the processes of aging through anti-aging measures. Although aging is the most common cause of death worldwide, it is socially mostly ignored as such and seen as "necessary" and "inevitable" anyway, which is why little money is spent on research into anti-aging therapies, a phenomenon known as the pro-aging trance.

The average lifespan is determined by vulnerability to accidents and age or lifestyle-related afflictions such as cancer or cardiovascular disease. Extension of average lifespan can be achieved by good diet, exercise, and avoidance of hazards such as smoking. Maximum lifespan is also determined by the rate of aging for a species inherent in its genes. Currently, the only widely recognized method of extending the maximum lifespan is calorie restriction. Theoretically, the extension of the maximum lifespan can be achieved by reducing the rate of aging damage, by periodic replacement of damaged tissues, or by molecular repair or rejuvenation of deteriorated cells and tissues.

A United States poll found that religious people and irreligious people, as well as men and women and people of different economic classes, have similar rates of support for life extension, while Africans and Hispanics have higher rates of support than white people. Thirty-Eight percent of the polled said they would desire to have their aging process cured.

Researchers of life extension are a subclass of biogerontologists known as "biomedical gerontologists." They try to understand the nature of aging, and they develop treatments to reverse aging processes or at least slow them down for the improvement of health and the maintenance of youthful vigor at every stage of life. Those who take advantage of life extension findings and seek to apply them to themselves are called "life extensionists" or "longevists." The primary life extension strategy currently is to apply available anti-aging methods in the hope of living long enough to benefit from a complete cure for aging once it is developed.

Cryonics 

Cryonics (from Greek κρύος 'kryos-' meaning 'icy cold') is the low-temperature preservation of animals and humans who cannot be sustained by contemporary medicine, with the hope that healing and resuscitation may be possible in the future.

Cryopreservation of people or large animals is not reversible with current technology. The stated rationale for cryonics is that people who are considered dead by current legal or medical definitions may not necessarily be dead according to the more stringent information-theoretic definition of death.

Some scientific literature is claimed to support the feasibility of cryonics. Medical science and cryobiologists generally regard cryonics with skepticism.

Location 

Around 1930, most people in Western countries died in their own homes, surrounded by family, and comforted by clergy, neighbors, and doctors making house calls. By the mid-20th century, half of all Americans died in a hospital. By the start of the 21st century, only about 20 to 25% of people in developed countries died outside of a medical institution. The shift from dying at home towards dying in a professional medical environment has been termed the "Invisible Death." This shift occurred gradually over the years until most deaths now occur outside the home.

Psychology 

Death studies is a field within psychology. Many people have a fear of dying. Discussing, thinking about, or planning for their deaths causes them discomfort. This fear may cause them to put off financial planning, preparing a will and testament, or requesting help from a hospice organization.

Mortality salience is the awareness that death is inevitable. However, self-esteem and culture are ways to reduce the anxiety this effect can cause. The awareness of someone's own death can cause a deepened bond in their in-group as a defense mechanism. This can also cause the person to become very judging. In a study, two groups were formed; one group was asked to reflect upon their mortality, the other was not, afterwards, the groups were told to set a bond for a prostitute. The group that did not reflect on death had an average of $50, the group who was reminded about their death had an average of $455 dollars.

Different people have different responses to the idea of their deaths. Philosopher Galen Strawson writes that the death that many people wish for is an instant, painless, unexperienced annihilation. In this unlikely scenario, the person dies without realizing it and without being able to fear it. One moment the person is walking, eating, or sleeping, and the next moment, the person is dead. Strawson reasons that this type of death would not take anything away from the person, as he believes a person cannot have a legitimate claim to ownership in the future.

Society and culture 

In society, the nature of death and humanity's awareness of its mortality has, for millennia, been a concern of the world's religious traditions and philosophical inquiry. Including belief in resurrection or an afterlife (associated with Abrahamic religions), reincarnation or rebirth (associated with Dharmic religions), or that consciousness permanently ceases to exist, known as eternal oblivion (associated with Secular humanism).

Commemoration ceremonies after death may include various mourning, funeral practices, and ceremonies of honoring the deceased. The physical remains of a person, commonly known as a corpse or body, are usually interred whole or cremated, though among the world's cultures, there are a variety of other methods of mortuary disposal. In the English language, blessings directed towards a dead person include rest in peace (originally the Latin, requiescat in pace) or its initialism RIP.

Death is the center of many traditions and organizations; customs relating to death are a feature of every culture around the world. Much of this revolves around the care of the dead, as well as the afterlife and the disposal of bodies upon the onset of death. The disposal of human corpses does, in general, begin with the last offices before significant time has passed, and ritualistic ceremonies often occur, most commonly interment or cremation. This is not a unified practice; in Tibet, for instance, the body is given a sky burial and left on a mountain top. Proper preparation for death and techniques and ceremonies for producing the ability to transfer one's spiritual attainments into another body (reincarnation) are subjects of detailed study in Tibet. Mummification or embalming is also prevalent in some cultures to retard the rate of decay.

Some parts of death in culture are legally based, having laws for when death occurs, such as the receiving of a death certificate, the settlement of the deceased estate, and the issues of inheritance and, in some countries, inheritance taxation.

Capital punishment is also a culturally divisive aspect of death. In most jurisdictions where capital punishment is carried out today, the death penalty is reserved for premeditated murder, espionage, treason, or as part of military justice. In some countries, sexual crimes, such as adultery and sodomy, carry the death penalty, as do religious crimes, such as apostasy, the formal renunciation of one's religion. In many retentionist countries, drug trafficking is also a capital offense. In China, human trafficking and serious cases of corruption are also punished by the death penalty. In militaries around the world, courts-martial have imposed death sentences for offenses such as cowardice, desertion, insubordination, and mutiny.

Death in warfare and suicide attack also have cultural links, and the ideas of dulce et decorum est pro patria mori, which translates to "It is sweet and proper to die for one's country," mutiny punishable by death, such as in the United States, grieving relatives of dead soldiers and death notification are embedded in many cultures. Recently in the western world, with the increase in terrorism following the September 11 attacks, but also further back in time with suicide bombings, kamikaze missions in World War II, and suicide missions in a host of other conflicts in history, death for a cause by way of suicide attack, and martyrdom have had significant cultural impacts.

Suicide, in general, and particularly euthanasia, are also points of cultural debate. Both acts are understood very differently in different cultures. In Japan, for example, ending a life with honor by seppuku was considered a desirable death, whereas according to traditional Christian and Islamic cultures, suicide is viewed as a sin.

Death is personified in many cultures, with such symbolic representations as the Grim Reaper, Azrael, the Hindu god Yama, and Father Time. In the west, the Grim Reaper, or figures similar to it, is the most popular depiction of death in western cultures.

In Brazil, death is counted officially when it is registered by existing family members at a cartório, a government-authorized registry. Before being able to file for an official death, the deceased must have been registered for an official birth at the cartório. Though a Public Registry Law guarantees all Brazilian citizens the right to register deaths, regardless of their financial means of their family members (often children), the Brazilian government has not taken away the burden, the hidden costs, and fees of filing for a death. For many impoverished families, the indirect costs and burden of filing for a death lead to a more appealing, unofficial, local, and cultural burial, which, in turn, raises the debate about inaccurate mortality rates.

Talking about death and witnessing it is a difficult issue in most cultures. Western societies may like to treat the dead with the utmost material respect, with an official embalmer and associated rites. Eastern societies (like India) may be more open to accepting it as a fait accompli, with a funeral procession of the dead body ending in an open-air burning-to-ashes.

Origins of death 

The origin of death is a theme or myth of how death came to be. It is present in nearly all cultures across the world, as death is a universal happening. This makes it an origin myth, a myth that describes how a feature of the natural or social world appeared. There can be some similarities between myths and cultures. In North American mythology, the theme of a man who wants to be immortal and a man who wants to die can be seen across many Indigenous people. In Christianity, death is the result of the fall of man after eating the fruit from the tree of the knowledge of good and evil. In Greek mythology, the opening of Pandora's box releases death upon the world.

Consciousness 

Much interest and debate surround the question of what happens to one's consciousness as one's body dies. The belief in the permanent loss of consciousness after death is often called eternal oblivion. The belief that the stream of consciousness is preserved after physical death is described by the term afterlife. Neither is likely to be confirmed without the ponderer having to die.

Near-death experiences are the closest thing people have to an afterlife that we know. Some people who have had near-death experiences (NDEs) report that they have seen the afterlife while they were dead. Seeing a being of light and talking with it, life flashing before the eyes, and the confirmation of cultural beliefs of the afterlife are all themes that happen during the moments they are dead.

In biology 

After death, the remains of a former organism become part of the biogeochemical cycle, during which animals may be consumed by a predator or a scavenger. Organic material may then be further decomposed by detritivores, organisms that recycle detritus, returning it to the environment for reuse in the food chain, where these chemicals may eventually end up being consumed and assimilated into the cells of an organism. Examples of detritivores include earthworms, woodlice, and millipedes.

Microorganisms also play a vital role, raising the temperature of the decomposing matter as they break it down into yet simpler molecules. Not all materials need to be fully decomposed. Coal, a fossil fuel formed over vast tracts of time in swamp ecosystems, is one example.

Natural selection 

The contemporary evolutionary theory sees death as an important part of the process of natural selection. It is considered that organisms less adapted to their environment are more likely to die, having produced fewer offspring, thereby reducing their contribution to the gene pool. Their genes are thus eventually bred out of a population, leading at worst to extinction and, more positively, making the process possible, referred to as speciation. Frequency of reproduction plays an equally important role in determining species survival: an organism that dies young but leaves numerous offspring displays, according to Darwinian criteria, much greater fitness than a long-lived organism leaving only one.

Death also has a role in competition, where if a species out-competes another, there is a risk of death for the population. Especially in the case where they are directly fighting over resources.

Extinction 

Death plays a role in extinction, the cessation of existence of a species or group of taxa, reducing biodiversity, due to extinction being generally considered to be the death of the last individual of that species (although the capacity to breed and recover may have been lost before this point). Because a species' potential range may be very large, determining this moment is difficult, and is usually done retrospectively.

Evolution of aging and mortality 

Inquiry into the evolution of aging aims to explain why so many living things and the vast majority of animals weaken and die with age. However, there are exceptions, such as Hydra and the jellyfish Turritopsis dohrnii, which research shows to be biologically immortal.

Organisms showing only asexual reproduction, such as bacteria, some protists, like the euglenoids and many amoebozoans, and unicellular organisms with sexual reproduction, colonial or not, like the volvocine algae Pandorina and Chlamydomonas, are "immortal" at some extent, dying only due to external hazards, like being eaten or meeting with a fatal accident. In multicellular organisms and also in multinucleate ciliates with a Weismannist development, that is, with a division of labor between mortal somatic (body) cells and "immortal" germ (reproductive) cells, death becomes an essential part of life, at least for the somatic line.

The Volvox algae are among the simplest organisms to exhibit that division of labor between two completely different cell types, and as a consequence, include the death of somatic line as a regular, genetically regulated part of its life history.

Grief in animals 
Animals have sometimes shown grief for their partners or "friends." When two chimpanzees form a bond together, sexual or not, and one of them dies, the surviving chimpanzee will show signs of grief, ripping out their hair in anger and starting to cry; if the body is removed, they will resist, they will eventually go quiet when the body is gone, but upon seeing the body again, the chimp will return to a violent state.

Death of abiotic factors 
Some non-living things can be considered dead. For example, a volcano, batteries, electrical components, and stars are all nonliving things that can "die," whether from destruction or cessation of function.

A volcano, a break in the earth's crust that allows lava, ash, and gases to escape, has three states that it may be in, active, dormant, and extinct. An active volcano has recently or is currently erupting; in a dormant volcano, it has not erupted for a significant amount of time, but it may erupt again; in an extinct volcano, it may be cut off from the supply of its lava and will never expected to erupt again, so the volcano can be considered to be dead.

A battery can be considered dead after the charge is fully used up. Electrical components are similar in this fashion, in the case that it may not be able to be used again,  such as after a spill of water on the components, the component can be considered dead.

Stars also have a life-span and, therefore, can die. After it starts to run out of fuel, it starts to expand, this can be analogous to the star aging. After it exhausts all fuel, it may explode in a supernova, collapse into a black hole, or turn into a neutron star.

Religious views

Buddhism 

In Buddhist doctrine and practice, death plays an important role. Awareness of death motivated Prince Siddhartha to strive to find the "deathless" and finally attain enlightenment. In Buddhist doctrine, death functions as a reminder of the value of having been born as a human being. Being reborn as a human being is considered the only state in which one can attain enlightenment. Therefore, death helps remind oneself that one should not take life for granted. The belief in rebirth among Buddhists does not necessarily remove death anxiety since all existence in the cycle of rebirth is considered filled with suffering, and being reborn many times does not necessarily mean that one progresses.

Death is part of several key Buddhist tenets, such as the Four Noble Truths and dependent origination.

Christianity 

While there are different sects of Christianity with different branches of belief. The overarching ideology on death grows from the knowledge of the afterlife. Meaning after death, the individual will undergo a separation from mortality to immortality; their soul leaves the body entering a realm of spirits. Following this separation of body and spirit (death), resurrection will occur. Representing the same transformation Jesus Christ embodied after his body was placed in the tomb for three days, each person's body will be resurrected, reuniting the spirit and body in a perfect form. This process allows the individual's soul to withstand death and transform into life after death.

Hinduism

In Hindu texts, death is described as the individual eternal spiritual jiva-atma (soul or conscious self) exiting the current temporary material body. The soul exits this body when the body can no longer sustain the conscious self (life), which may be due to mental or physical reasons or, more accurately, the inability to act on one's kama (material desires). During conception, the soul enters a compatible new body based on the remaining merits and demerits of one's karma (good/bad material activities based on dharma) and the state of one's mind (impressions or last thoughts) at the time of death.

Usually, the process of reincarnation makes one forget all memories of one's previous life. Because nothing really dies and the temporary material body is always changing, both in this life and the next, death means forgetfulness of one's previous experiences.

Islam
The Islamic view is that death is the separation of the soul from the body as well as the beginning of the afterlife. The afterlife, or akhirah, is one of the six main beliefs in Islam. Rather than seeing death as the end of life, Muslims consider death as a continuation of life in another form. In Islam, life on earth right now is a short, temporary life and a testing period for every soul. True life begins with the Day of Judgement when all people will be divided into two groups. The righteous believers will be welcomed to janna (heaven), and the disbelievers and evildoers will be punished in jahannam (hellfire).

Muslims believe death to be wholly natural and predetermined by God. Only God knows the exact time of a person’s death. The Quran emphasizes that death is inevitable, no matter how much people try to escape death, it will reach everyone. (Q50:16) Life on earth is the one and only chance for people to prepare themselves for the life to come and choose to either believe or not believe in God, and death is the end of that learning opportunity.

Judaism 

There are a variety of beliefs about the afterlife within Judaism, but none of them contradict the preference for life over death. This is partially because death puts a cessation to the possibility of fulfilling any commandments.

Language 
The word "death" comes from Old English dēaþ, which in turn comes from Proto-Germanic *dauþuz (reconstructed by etymological analysis). This comes from the Proto-Indo-European stem *dheu- meaning the "process, act, condition of dying."

The concept and symptoms of death, and varying degrees of delicacy used in discussion in public forums, have generated numerous scientific, legal, and socially acceptable terms or euphemisms. When a person has died, it is also said they have "passed away", "passed on", "expired", or "gone", among other socially accepted, religiously specific, slang, and irreverent terms.

As a formal reference to a dead person, it has become common practice to use the participle form of "decease", as in "the deceased"; another noun form is "decedent".

Bereft of life, the dead person is a "corpse", "cadaver", "body", "set of remains" or, when all flesh is gone, a "skeleton". The terms "carrion" and "carcass" are also used, usually for dead non-human animals. The ashes left after a cremation are lately called "cremains".

See also 

 Deathbed
 Death drive
 Death row
 Death trajectory
 Dying declaration
 End-of-life care
 Eschatology
 Faked death
 Karōshi
 Last rites
 List of expressions related to death
 Spiritual death
 Survivalism (life after death)
 Taboo on the dead
 Thanatology

References

Bibliography

Further reading

External links 

 
 
 
 
  Interviews with people dying in hospices, and portraits of them before, and shortly after, death.
  How the medical profession categorized causes of death.
  A biologist explains life and death in different kinds of organisms, in relation to evolution.
 "Death" (video; 10:18) by Timothy Ferris, producer of the Voyager Golden Record for NASA. 2021

 
Senescence